Santiago Canyon College is a public community college in Orange, California.  Along with Santa Ana College, Santiago is one of two campuses in the Rancho Santiago Community College District (RSCCD).

History
In 1980, The Irvine Company sold 30 acres of land to RSCCD.    In 1985, RSCCD opened the school, which was simply called the Orange Campus at that time.  Enrollment was approximately 2,500 students during the first semester of operation.  In July 1997, the school separated from Santa Ana College and changed its name to Santiago Canyon College.

In January 2000, the school was independently accredited by the Accrediting Commission for Community and Junior Colleges, which is part of the Western Association of Schools and Colleges.  Later that year, The Irvine Company donated an additional 12 acres to the school.  The school's footprint expanded again in April 2003 when RSCCD used funds from Measure E (passed in November 2002) to buy nearly 19 additional acres.

In September 2004, a new student services and instruction building was completed.  In late 2006, the new library opened.  In January 2009, the softball complex opened.  The new science center opened for the Fall 2010 semester.

In January 2013, the Athletics and Aquatics Complex opened.

Campus
The library building earned a merit award from the American Institute of Architects' Committee on Architecture for Education. It was designed by LPA Architecture. The Library offers not only a wide selection of books, but computer access, private study rooms, and educational media.

Academics
The school offers 65 associate degrees.

Athletics
The Hawks compete in the Orange Empire Conference  and have a total of 8 sports. Sports in the Fall include Men's and Women's Cross Country, Men's and Women's Soccer and Women's Volleyball. Winter sports include Men's basketball. Spring sports include Softball and Men's Volleyball. In December 2009, the Hawks won the state title in women's soccer and were named Division III national champions by the National Soccer Coaches Association of America. In December 2018, the Hawks won their third State Title after having a perfect 24–0 season.

Men's and Women's Cross Country

Cross Country is SCC's longest tenured sport having started in 2002. The team is led by Head Coach Shawn Cummins and is assisted by Patrick Imfeld and Yoseline Torres. Over the years, this program has boasted a number of All-American, All-State, and All OEC selections.

Women's Softball

In spring 2016, the Hawks won the California Community College Athletic Association state championship in women's softball.

Women's Soccer

The Hawks won back-to-back state championships in 2018 and 2019.

Men's Soccer

The Men's Soccer team had its inaugural season in 2004. The team is currently led by Head Coach Jimmy Obleda and is assisted by Tony Bruce, Sol Campos, Mike Rubio and Claine Plummer.

In spring 2017, Santiago debuted a men's volleyball team.

Student body

Santiago Canyon College has a total undergraduate population of 13,613.  36% of the student population is part-time. 51% of the student body is male and 49% is female.

References

https://sccollege.edu/About/president/Pages/default.aspx

External links
Official website

California Community Colleges
Universities and colleges in Orange County, California
Education in Orange, California
Educational institutions established in 1985
Schools accredited by the Western Association of Schools and Colleges
Sports in Orange, California
Two-year colleges in the United States
1985 establishments in California